Obba may refer to:

 Obba (town), an ancient town and former bishopric in the Roman province of Africa, now a Latin Catholic titular see 
 Oba (goddess), a Yoruba goddess

 Biology 
 Obba (fungus), a fungus genus in the order Polyporales
 Obba (gastropod), a genus of land snail in the family Camaenidae
 Obba, a synonym for Ugia, a genus of moths

 People
 Obba Babatundé (born 1950), American stage and movie actor
 Hatem Obba (born 1991), Tunisian volleyball player

See also 
 Oba (disambiguation)